Nicholas Cushing (born 9 November 1984) is an English football manager who is the head coach for New York City FC in Major League Soccer.

Career

Manchester City Women
Originally joining the club in a junior role in 2008, Cushing worked his way through a succession of coaching positions starting as a schools coach and progressing to the academy setup before transitioning into the club's women's team. In 2013, as the Manchester City Women began their preparations for their first season in the newly expanded WSL, Cushing was offered his first senior role when he was promoted to the women's team's managerial position, trading places with incumbent manager Leigh Wood, who left the club shortly afterwards.

In his first season Cushing's City started slowly as they adjusted to their new first division status, finishing fifth of eight teams and registering only six victories from their 14 matches, although the season was salvaged to some extent when Manchester City became the first team in four seasons to beat Arsenal to the FA WSL Cup trophy. Their lacklustre form continued at the start of the 2015 season as they took five points from their opening five league games before the season was interrupted for two months by the 2015 Women's World Cup, in which England finished a very creditable third. Returning from the break, England's performance seemingly brought Cushing's City team to life as he managed them to a run of 12 wins in 13 matches.

Although his side had ended 2015 trophyless, they entered the following season in rampant form, going unbeaten in the league with an unprecedented defensive record of only four goals conceded in 16 games to win a first league title. Cushing then added to his trophy haul with a second WSL Cup triumph in a match which was equally notable for his decision to remain through extra time to the final whistle despite being called to attend his wife going into labour with his third child. Nick also added to his honours with a personal gong, winning Manager of the Year at the FA's Women's Football Awards. While his City team disappointed somewhat as they failed to defend their title in the Spring Series, Cushing was at least able to complete his clean sweep of the domestic trophies, winning the FA Women's Cup with a comprehensive defeat of Birmingham City in May 2017.

New York City FC
On 9 January 2020, it was announced that Cushing would move to become assistant coach to Ronny Deila at MLS side New York City FC, with his last match in charge of Manchester City Women being against Arsenal on 2 February 2020. On 13 June 2022, Cushing became interim head coach for the club after head coach Ronny Deila departed for Belgian club Standard Liège. On November 10, 2022, Cushing was promoted to head coach ahead of the 2023 season.

Managerial statistics

Honours 
Manchester City Women

 Women's Super League: 2016
 FA Women's Cup: 2016–17

 FA Women's League Cup: 2014, 2016
Individual

 FA Women's Manager of the Year: 2016

References

1984 births
Living people
English football managers
Sportspeople from Chester
Manchester City W.F.C. managers
Women's Super League managers
New York City FC non-playing staff
New York City FC coaches
English expatriate football managers
Expatriate soccer managers in the United States
English expatriates in the United States